Dekkhinathiri Township is one of Naypyidaw Union Territory's eight townships, located south of Mandalay Region in Burma.

History
Dekkhinathiri Township was designated as one of the original townships constituting the new capital region of Naypyidaw on 26 March 2006 by the Ministry of Home Affairs (Myanmar) (MOHA), comprising 2 wards, 6 village tracts and 24 villages. It was named Dekkhinathiri Township on 20 January 2011 by the Ministry of Home Affairs. Dekkhinathiri is derived from Pali , and literally means "splendor of the south."

Demographics

2014

The 2014 Myanmar Census reported that Dekkhinathiri Township had a population of 51,328. The population density was 328.8 people per km2. The census reported that the median age was 25.1 years, and 111 males per 100 females. There were 6,997 households; the mean household size was 3.9.

References

Naypyidaw